The 16th Utah Senate District is located in Provo, Utah and includes Utah House Districts 61, 62, 63, and 64. The current State Senator representing the 16th district is Curt Bramble. Bramble was elected to the Utah Senate in 2000 and is up for re-election in 2020. His opponent is Sylvia Andrew.

Previous Utah State Senators (District 16)

Election results

2008 General Election

2004 General Election

Current Candidates

Note: See footnote for candidate listing guidelines.

See also

 Curtis S. Bramble
 Sylvia Andrew
 RaDene Hatfield
 Utah Democratic Party
 Utah Republican Party
 Utah Senate

References

External links
 Utah Senate District Profiles
 Official Biography of Curtis S. Bramble
 Official Website of Sylvia Andrew
 Official Website of RaDene Hatfield

16
Provo, Utah